S11 may refer to:

Aircraft 
 Fokker S-11, a trainer aircraft
 Rans S-11 Pursuit, an American light aircraft
 SABCA S.11, a Belgian prototype airliner
 Sikorsky S-11, a Russian reconnaissance aircraft
 SPAD S.XI, a French reconnaissance biplane

Rail and transit

Lines 
 S11 (Rhine-Ruhr S-Bahn), Germany
 S11 (ZVV), Zürich, Switzerland
 Line S11 (Milan suburban railway service), Italy
 S11, of the Hamburg S-Bahn, Germany
 S11, of the Karlsruhe Stadtbahn, Germany

Locomotives 
 ALCO S-11, a diesel-electric switcher
 LSWR S11 class, a steam locomotive
 Sri Lanka Railways S11, a diesel multiple unit

Stations 
 Kitanada Station, in Ōzu, Ehime Prefecture, Japan
 Morishita Station (Tokyo), in Kōtō, Tokyo, Japan
 Myōhōji Station (Hyōgo), in Suma-ku, Kobe, Hyōgo Prefecture, Japan
 Sakurayama Station, in Mizuho-ku, Nagoya, Aichi Prefecture, Japan
 Wutthakat BTS station, in Bangkok, Thailan
 Zenibako Station, in Otaru, Hokkaido, Japan

Roads 
 S11 highway (Georgia)
 Expressway S11 (Poland)
 County Route S11 (California), United States

Submarines 
 Brazilian submarine Rio Grande do Sul (S11) (Balao class), in service 1963–1972
 Brazilian submarine Rio Grande do Sul (S11) (Tench class), in service 1972–1978
 , of the Royal Navy
 , of the United States Navy

Other uses 
 S11 (classification), a disability swimming classification
 S11 (protest), at the meeting of the World Economic Forum in Melbourne, Australia on September 11, 2000
 40S ribosomal protein S11
 British NVC community S11, see swamps and tall-herb fens in the British National Vegetation Classification system
 Nissan Silvia (S11), a sports car
 Project S-11, a video game
 September 11 attacks
 S11, a postcode district in Sheffield, England
 S-11, a creature in the Sharktopus film